James Ford Strachan (1810 – 14 April 1875) was a merchant, grazier and politician in colonial Victoria, Australia, and a member of the Victorian Legislative Council.

Strachan was born in Montrose, Scotland, the fifth son of John Strachan and his wife Isobel, née Smith. 
Strachan arrived in Van Diemen's Land in 1832 with his widowed mother and two sisters. He was an early settler in Port Phillip District (which later became Victoria), and a leading merchant in Melbourne, in which city he built the first brick store.

Strachan was an active promoter of separation from New South Wales, and when the colony of Victoria was constituted in 1851 he was returned to the semi-elective Legislative Council, then the only chamber, as member for Geelong in October of that year. After responsible government was conceded in 1855, Strachan was elected to the first wholly elective Legislative Council for the South-Western Province in November 1856. He was a member of the second Haines Ministry without portfolio from April 1857 to March 1858. During the great constitutional battle between the two Houses on the tariff and Darling grant "tacks" Strachan took a leading part on the side of the Council, and resigning his seat for the South-Western Province, contested the Western Province against Henry Miller, who had accepted office under Sir James McCulloch, and defeated him on 10 August 1866. Strachan held the seat until September 1874.

Strachan died at Geelong, Victoria on 14 April 1875, aged sixty-five years. He was married to Lilias Cross née Murray, daughter of Hugh Murray, a fellow Scottish emigrant, merchant and grazier.

References

 

1810 births
1875 deaths
Members of the Victorian Legislative Council
Scottish emigrants to colonial Australia
People from Montrose, Angus
Australian pastoralists
19th-century Australian politicians
19th-century Australian businesspeople